Lee Yeon-sun (born 12 December 1973) is a South Korean volleyball player. She competed in the women's tournament at the 2000 Summer Olympics.

References

1973 births
Living people
South Korean women's volleyball players
Olympic volleyball players of South Korea
Volleyball players at the 2000 Summer Olympics
Place of birth missing (living people)